Bedari is a Pakistani Urdu black and white film which was released in 1956. 

This film had an identical plot and the songs like Indian film Jagriti (1954), with replacement of some words, and music was taken directly from Jagritias well. Actor Rattan Kumar (Syed Nazir Ali), who had moved from India to Pakistan with his family, played a lead role in this film. When 'Bedari' was released in Pakistan in 1956, it made fabulous business in the first few weeks of exhibition. However, when it was discovered by the Pakistani cinemagoers that they were watching a plagiarized film, there was a mass uproar that caused public demonstrations against exhibition of the plagiarized film. The Censor Board of Pakistan immediately put a ban on this film.

Music
The music of the film was composed by Ustad Fateh Ali Khan, a veteran Pakistani sitar player. The songs were written by Fayyaz Hashmi, and sung by Munawwar Sultana and Saleem Raza. A song which was a straight lift of the 'De Di Humein Azaadi' tune was titled Aye Quaid-e-Azam Tera Ehsaan Hai Ehsaan. The lines 'De di humein azaadi bina khadag bina dhal/ Sabarmati ke sant tu ne kar diya kamaal' had been changed to 'De di humein azaadi ki duniya huyi hairaan/ Aye Quaid-e-Azam tera ehsaan hai ehsaan'. In other words, a song celebrating the Indian Father of the Nation had been transposed to eulogize his Pakistani counterpart.

 , by Munawwar Sultana
 , by Saleem Raza
 , by Salem Raza
 

Highlight of this film was its popular film songs and music. Ustad Fateh Ali Khan was the foremost sitar player at that time in Pakistan and composed the music of this film. Bedari was also a debut film of now renowned Pakistani actor Qazi Wajid who, as a teenage student, played a very funny role of a student with a stammer disorder.

References

External links
 

1950s Urdu-language films
Pakistani war films
Pakistani black-and-white films
Pakistani remakes of Indian films
Urdu-language Pakistani films